The Poughkeepsie Yacht Club (PYC) is a small private yacht club based in the Hudson River Valley in upstate New York. The club is one of the earliest yachting institutions in America and founded in 1892.  The club is located on the eastern shore in the heart of the Hudson Valley, on a part of the Hudson River about halfway between New York City and Albany.  It shares a close proximity to the Hyde Park historic sites and the town of Rhinebeck. Its officers include a Commodore, Vice-Commodore, Rear-Commodore,  Measurer, Secretary, and Treasurer.

History
The Poughkeepsie Yacht Club was founded on 1892 by a small group of working sailors and yachtsmen. 

It now has approximately one-hundred twenty "active" (boat owning) and "social" (non-boat owning) members.

During the early years of the club's history, rowing played an important role fostering interest and membership. This led to the negotiations securing the first race of the "University Eights" (Intercollegiate Regatta) in June 1895.  In addition to racing, yachting, and rowing, iceboating was popular with club members as well. The club field had as many as seven ice yachts, generally storing four in the boat house.

Traditionally the Poughkeepsie Yacht Club has been a "working club," where members take part in maintaining the club facilities and grounds. Participation hours include activities such as the "all hands on deck" docks in and docks out as well as working on the annual events hosted at the club. Members may choose the committee with which they wish to be affiliated (i.e., docks, membership, house, grounds, moorings, entertainment, etc.)

Clubhouses

In 1892, the club’s first clubhouse was established in a modest, building in Poughkeepsie, New York, on what is now the water front of lower Main Street in Poughkeepsie. The club leased a dock known as the "Sand Dock" from the New York Central and Hudson River Railroad company at a rate of $25 per year. The first clubhouse was built by May of the following year. The location was on the site of the old Revolutionary Ship Yard (or Continental Shipyard) at Ship Yard Point, now known as Fox's Point in Poughkeepsie.  The first club house was a wooden structure twenty by twenty feet, and two stories high.  With money in short supply, unusual fund raising methods were employed. For example, in 1897, the veranda in front of the house was added using the proceeds of the "Autumn Carnival".  The Club has always been a "working man's club" and today aims to uphold the humble tradition.

In 1905, the club's second clubhouse was erected at a new location. The club largely had an untroubled history until the Fall of 1904 when the club had to move due to a land deal. After a great deal of effort and negotiation, a deal was made just south of the present Mid-Hudson Bridge, at the end of Union Street.

In 1974, the club's third clubhouse was built. Due to frustration with the Poughkeepsie Urban Renewal project, and the lack of land for winter storage and launching, the club moved location to its present location in Staatsburg, New York.

The current clubhouse is a two-storied building offering an unobstructed panoramic view of the Hudson River from its East shore location.  Although the name (“Poughkeepsie”) comes from the Club's origins in the late 19th century (founded in 1892), it is now located in Staatsburg New York, on historic Route U.S. 9. Nearby attractions include the Franklin Delano Roosevelt Hyde Park Home, FDR Library and Museum, the Eleanor Roosevelt Home, the Vanderbilt Estate and grounds (including hiking trails), the Ogden Mills Estate, Norrie State Park, and the Culinary Institute of America.

Commodores

Gallery

Notes

References
 Minute Books for the years 1892 - 1975 located at the Local History Room of the Adriance Memorial Library, Market Street, Poughkeepsie, NY
 The Poughkeepsie Yacht Club, Copyright 1992, Arthur E. Scott

External links
 Official Website

1892 establishments in New York (state)
Buildings and structures in Dutchess County, New York
Hudson River
Sailing in New York (state)
Sports organizations established in 1892
Gentlemen's clubs in New York (state)
Yacht clubs in the United States